Senator Sweeney may refer to:

John James Sweeney (born 1927), Pennsylvania State Senate
Patrick Sweeney (politician) (1939–2020), Ohio State Senate
Stephen M. Sweeney (born 1959), New Jersey State Senate
Thomas Sweeney (glassmaker) (1806–1890), Virginia State Senate
Thomas Sweeney (politician) (1903–1973), West Virginia State Senate

See also
Joseph Henry Sweney (1845–1918), Iowa State Senate